Conica may refer to:
 Conica (book) by Apollonius of Perga
 Conica (Hydrozoa), a suborder of Leptomedusa
 Several species with the epithet capitata:
 Annona conica (= Raimondia conica), a custard apple
 Fonscochlea conica, a snail
 Knema conica, a plant related to nutmeg
 Paludinella conica, a snail
 Phrantela conica, a snail
 Pyrgulopsis conica, the Kingman Springsnail
 Samoana conica, a snail
 Shorea conica, a dipterocarp tree